The Sălăuța is a right tributary of the river Someșul Mare in Romania. It discharges into the Someșul Mare in Salva.

Tributaries

The following rivers are tributaries to the river Sălăuța:

Left: Frumușica, Pârâul Repede, Strâmba, Telcișor, Valea Cerbului, Valea Stegii

Right: Valea Săbii, Fiad, Fiadțel, Bichigiu

References

Rivers of Romania
Rivers of Bistrița-Năsăud County